The Chattanooga School for the Arts & Sciences is a K–12 magnet school in Chattanooga, Tennessee. It was opened in 1986 in the former Wyatt Hall building which was used as a high school until 1983. The building was built in 1920–1921 and designed by Reuben H. Hunt, a Chattanooga architect. Its liberal-arts curriculum is patterned on Mortimer Adler's Paideia philosophy. The physical building has been a school in several incarnations, and was once attended by Samuel L. Jackson (as Riverside High School).

The building was added to the National Register of Historic Places in 1986 as Wyatt Hall.  It was designed by architect Reuben H. Hunt in Georgian Revival style.

It was named for Professor Henry D. Wyatt, founder of the public school system in Chattanooga, a teacher and the first Superintendent of Schools.

It was also known as Chattanooga High School.

References

National Register of Historic Places in Hamilton County, Tennessee
Colonial Revival architecture in Tennessee

Public middle schools in Tennessee
Public high schools in Tennessee
Magnet schools in Tennessee
Educational institutions established in 1986
Schools in Chattanooga, Tennessee
Public elementary schools in Tennessee
1986 establishments in Tennessee
National Register of Historic Places in Chattanooga, Tennessee
School buildings on the National Register of Historic Places in Tennessee